Inxuba Yethemba Local Municipality, formerly known as Cradock Local Municipality, is a local municipality in Chris Hani District Municipality, Eastern Cape. The seat is Cradock.

Politics 

The municipal council consists of eighteen members elected by mixed-member proportional representation. Nine councillors are elected by first-past-the-post voting in nine wards, while the remaining nine are chosen from party lists so that the total number of party representatives is proportional to the number of votes received. In the election of 1 November 2021 the African National Congress (ANC) won a majority of ten seats on the council.

The following table shows the results of the election.

Main places
The 2001 census divided the municipality into the following main places:

References

External links
 Official website

Local municipalities of the Chris Hani District Municipality
Karoo